Valentin Wunderlich (born 2 August 1996) is a German ice dancer. With his skating partner, Ria Schwendinger, he reached the final segment at three World Junior Championships and finished within the top ten in 2017 (Taipei) and 2018 (Sofia).

Skating career

Early years 

Wunderlich began skating as a five-year-old in Ulm and relocated to Oberstdorf when he was 15. During the 2011–2012 season, he competed in novice ice dancing with Marisa Sailer.

Partnership with Schwendinger 
In 2013, Wunderlich teamed up with Ria Schwendinger. Their ISU Junior Grand Prix debut came in 2014. During their third season together, they won their first German national junior title and were sent to the 2016 World Junior Championships in Debrecen, Hungary. Ranked 17th in the short dance, they qualified to the free dance and would move up to 16th overall.

Around 2016, Wunderlich became a Sportsoldat in the Bundeswehr.

Schwendinger/Wunderlich placed 13th in the short dance, 10th in the free dance, and 10th overall at the 2017 World Junior Championships in Taipei, Taiwan. Their result allowed Germany to send two ice dancing teams to the 2018 edition of the event. At the 2018 World Junior Championships, held in Sofia, Bulgaria, the duo again finished 10th, having placed 10th in both segments. Rostislav Sinicyn, Natalia Karamysheva, and Martin Skotnický coach them in Oberstdorf, Germany.

Programs 
(with Schwendinger)

Competitive highlights 
CS: Challenger Series; JGP: Junior Grand Prix

Ice dancing with Schwendinger

Ice dancing with Sailer

Men's singles

References

External links 

 

1996 births
German male ice dancers
Living people
Sportspeople from Ulm